Dobro Pole or Dóbro Pólie,, is a peak situated on the Greek–North Macedonian border.

The nearest villages are Zoviḱ in the Novaci Municipality in the Mariovo region of North Macedonia, and Prómachoi in the Voras Mountains in the Pella regional unit, northern Greece. 

The Battle of Dobro Pole was fought around the Dobro Pole between 15 and 18 September 1918.

External links 

 Peakery
 Mapcarta
 Where is Macedonia

Mountains of North Macedonia
Greece–North Macedonia border